Karalar is a village in the Besni District, Adıyaman Province, Turkey. The village is populated by Kurds of the Atma tribe and had a population of 220 in 2021.

References

Villages in Besni District
Kurdish settlements in Adıyaman Province